Dominic Crosby is a former rugby league footballer who last played as a  for the Leeds Rhinos in the Betfred Super League.

He played for the Wigan Warriors in the Super League, and on loan from Wigan at the Widnes Vikings and the Leigh Centurions in the Championship, and the South Wales Scorpions in Championship 1. He played for the Warrington Wolves in the Super League, and spent time on from Warrington at Leeds ahead of a permanent move to Headingley.

Background
Crosby was born in Wigan, Greater Manchester, England.

Career
After spells with Widnes (2011) and South Wales Scorpions (2012) on dual registration terms he made his first team début for the Warriors in the 2012 Challenge Cup 4th round match against the North Wales Crusaders.

Crosby played in the 2013 Super League Grand Final victory over the Warrington Wolves at Old Trafford.
Crosby played in the 2014 Super League Grand Final against St. Helens at Old Trafford.
Crosby then played in the 2015 Super League Grand Final defeat against Leeds at Old Trafford.
Crosby played in the 2016 Super League Grand Final victory against Warrington at Old Trafford.

Leeds Rhinos
On 1 September 2020, it was reported that he was forced to retire through injury.

References

External links
Leeds Rhinos profile
Warrington Wolves profile
Wigan Warriors profile
SL profile

1990 births
Living people
English rugby league players
Leeds Rhinos players
Leigh Leopards players
Rugby league halfbacks
Rugby league players from Billinge, Merseyside
South Wales Scorpions players
Warrington Wolves players
Widnes Vikings players
Wigan Warriors players